The 2010–11 Moldovan "B" Division season' was the 20th since its establishment. Was approved new system with three divisions, thus coming back to the system that was used  between the 1993–94 and 1995–96 seasons.

Final standings

North

Center

South

References
 Regulamentul campionatului R. Moldova la fotbal ediţia 2010-2011

External links
 Divizia Naţională - Divizia B 2010/11 - Rezultate
 Divizia B - Results, fixtures, tables and news - Soccerway

Moldovan Liga 2 seasons
3
Moldova